Izzy Gomez may refer to:

Izzy Gomez (restaurateur), Portuguese-American restaurateur from San Francisco, California 
Izzy Gomez, fictional character from the British children's TV series TUGS